Yorick Treille (born July 15, 1980) is a French former professional ice hockey forward. Treille was drafted by the Chicago Blackhawks of the National Hockey League (NHL) in 1999, but never played in the NHL. He went to university at the University of Massachusetts Lowell and has played for the Providence Bruins and Norfolk Admirals of the American Hockey League, as well as teams in Finland, Switzerland, and Germany. Treille has played for the French national team multiple World Championships, as well as the 2002 Winter Olympics. His brother, Sacha Treille, is also an ice hockey player, and has played for the French national team.

Career statistics

Regular season and playoffs

International

External links
 

1980 births
Living people
Brûleurs de Loups players
Chicago Blackhawks draft picks
Dragons de Rouen players
EC Red Bull Salzburg players
ERC Ingolstadt players
France men's national ice hockey team coaches
French ice hockey right wingers
Genève-Servette HC players
HC Vítkovice players
HC Sparta Praha players
HIFK (ice hockey) players
Ice hockey players at the 2002 Winter Olympics
Norfolk Admirals players
Notre Dame Hounds players
Olympic ice hockey players of France
Sportspeople from Cannes
Piráti Chomutov players
Providence Bruins players
Scorpions de Mulhouse players
UMass Lowell River Hawks men's ice hockey players
French expatriate ice hockey people
French expatriate sportspeople in the United States
French expatriate sportspeople in Germany
French expatriate sportspeople in Finland
French expatriate sportspeople in Switzerland
French expatriate sportspeople in the Czech Republic
French expatriate sportspeople in Austria
Expatriate ice hockey players in the United States
Expatriate ice hockey players in Germany
Expatriate ice hockey players in Finland
Expatriate ice hockey players in Switzerland
Expatriate ice hockey players in the Czech Republic
Expatriate ice hockey players in Austria
French ice hockey coaches